Didier Palleti, C.R.L. (1587–1658) was a Roman Catholic prelate who served as Bishop of Nice (1644–1658).

Biography
Didier Palleti was born in 1587 in Verceil, France and ordained a priest in the Canons Regular of the Lateran.
On 28 Nov 1644, he was appointed during the papacy of Pope Innocent X as Bishop of Nice.
On 18 Dec 1644, he was consecrated bishop by Marcantonio Franciotti, Bishop of Lucca, with Alfonso Pandolfi, Bishop of Comacchio, and Gregorio Panzani, Bishop of Mileto, with serving as co-consecrators.
He served as Bishop of Nice until his death on 18 Sep 1658.

References

External links and additional sources
 (for Chronology of Bishops) 
 (for Chronology of Bishops)  

17th-century French Roman Catholic bishops
Bishops appointed by Pope Innocent X
1587 births
1658 deaths